The Mindel is a river in Bavaria, southern Germany. The Mindel originates west of Kaufbeuren, in the Allgäu region, and flows generally north. It flows into the Danube (right tributary) in Gundremmingen, east of Günzburg. The towns Mindelheim, Burgau and Thannhausen lie along the Mindel.

The Mindel gave its name to the Mindel glaciation in the Alps.

References 

 
Rivers of Bavaria
Bodies of water of Günzburg (district)
Rivers of Germany